The 1979 UCI Juniors Track World Championships were the fifth annual Junior World Championship for track cycling held in Buenos Aires, Argentina in August 1979. It was the second championship to be held outside Europe, the second to be held in the Americas, and the first to be held in the southern hemisphere.

The Championships had five events for men only, Sprint, Points race, Individual pursuit, Team pursuit and 1 kilometre time trial. With two golds and a bronze, Fredy Schmidtke had the most successful single games for a cyclist to date, while future Tour de France legend Greg LeMond won his first major medal for the United States.

Events

Medal table

References

UCI Juniors Track World Championships
Sports competitions in Buenos Aires
1978 in track cycling
Track cycling
International cycle races hosted by Argentina